Dyacopterus is a genus of megabats from south-east Asia. It contains three species, namely:

Brooks's dyak fruit bat, Dyacopterus brooksi
Dayak fruit bat, Dyacopterus spadiceus
Rickart's dyak fruit bat, Dyacopterus rickarti

References

 
Mammals of Asia
Bat genera